Artie Kempner is an American director for FOX Sports. He is known for his work on the NFL, directing Super Bowls XLII (2008) and XXXIX (2005), as well as NASCAR, where he has directed 14 Daytona 500 races. His directorial credits also include the Masters, NCAA Basketball tournament,  NBA for Turner Sports, Thursday Night Football on the NFL Network, the NFL playoffs on NBC Sports, the NHL on Fox, as well as the Fox prime time entertainment special, Opening the Lost Tombs: Live from Egypt (1999).

Background
Artie Kempner attended John F. Kennedy High School in Bellmore, NY, and was inducted into the School's Hall of Fame in 2013. He graduated from The University of Florida in 1981 with a degree in Journalism and Communications. He also played varsity football while at Florida. Kempner now lives in Wilmington, Delaware.

Career
Kempner is a 12-time Sports Emmy winner.  Most recently in the category of "Best Sports Series," as director of Fox Sports coverage of NASCAR, which has won 4 times: 2001, 2005, 2007 and 2014.

Autism advocacy
Artie Kempner is the founding president of Autism Delaware. Along with a dedicated group of parents, Autism Delaware has gone from an all-volunteer organization based in the Kempner's home, to a lifespan service agency. The adult services arm of the organization known as POW&R, is a program that currently serves over 145 individuals on the autism spectrum. Kempner has been passionate advocating for the Autism community since 1998 when his son Ethan was diagnosed with the disorder.  He helped to establish the Fox supports program, and established the Autism Speaks 400, now known as the "AAA 400 Drive for Autism" at Dover International Speedway.  Kempner received the 2015 OM Foundation Award in February 2015 in Cincinnati, at The National Sports Forum, the largest cross‐team sports sales and marketing conference in North America.

References

External links
 

University of Florida alumni
Florida Gators football players
People from Bellmore, New York
Year of birth missing (living people)
Living people
American television directors
John F. Kennedy High School (Bellmore, New York) alumni